Hugh Albert Tait (20 April 1892 – 30 July 1983) was an Australian rules footballer who played with Essendon in the Victorian Football League (VFL).

Notes

External links 

1892 births
1983 deaths
Australian rules footballers from Melbourne
Essendon Football Club players
Oakleigh Football Club players
People from Preston, Victoria